K. C. Reddy Ministry was the Council of Ministers in Mysore, a state in South India headed by K. Chengalaraya Reddy of the Indian National Congress.

The ministry had multiple  ministers including the Chief Minister of Mysore. All ministers belonged to the Indian National Congress.

After independence of India in 1947, he was at the forefront of the Mysore Chalo movement seeking responsible state government in Mysore State and went on to become the first Chief Minister of the state after Jayachamarajendra Wadiyar, the Maharaja of Mysore signed the Instrument of Accession to join the new dominion of India on three subjects, namely, defence, external affairs, communications and hence Mysore did not lose its sovereignty on other subjects. The Constitution of India was adopted by the Indian Constituent Assembly on 26 November 1949 and came into effect on 26 January 1950 with a democratic government system, completing the country's transition towards becoming an independent republic replacing the Government of India Act (1935) as the governing document of India and thus, turning the nation into a newly formed republic.

Mysore became a Part-B state of the union because Maharaja of Mysore issued a proclamation on this regard on 25 November 1949.

K. C. Reddy Ministry was an adhoc arrangement from 25 October 1947 (even though India became Republic on 26 January 1950) till the first election under Adult franchise was held in 1952 and Kengal Hanumanthaiah was elected as Chief Minister of Mysore post elections there by ending the unscheduled tenure of K. C. Reddy Ministry.

Chief Minister & Cabinet Ministers

See also 
 Mysore Legislative Assembly
 Mysore Legislative Council
 Politics of Mysore

References 

Cabinets established in 1947
1947 establishments in Mysore State
1947 in Indian politics
1952 disestablishments in India
Reddy
Indian National Congress state ministries
Cabinets disestablished in 1952